Jizhou District, formerly a county known as  Ji County, is a district in the far north of the municipality of Tianjin, People's Republic of China, holding cultural and historical significance (e.g., the Buddhist Temple of Solitary Joy).

Overview

The administration of Jizhou was transferred from Hebei province to Tianjin in 1973. Historically, it was also known as Yuyang during the Tang Dynasty.

Jizhou is the only mountainous area in the Tianjin municipality, home to the renowned Mount Pan. Known as "Tianjin's backyard", the spectacular natural scenery and numerous historical monuments, including a small section of the Great Wall known as Huangyaguan, in the county means that it is a major tourist attraction. It is also well known for its abundance of unique, local fruits and nuts.

Administrative divisions
There are 1 subdistrict, 25 towns, and 1 ethnic township in the county:

Climate

References

External links
Jizhou Government official website

Districts of Tianjin